Lions Air is a charter airline based in Zürich, Switzerland. It operates air charter and business services, using fixed-wing aircraft and helicopters.

History
The airline was established in 1986 by Jürg Fleischmann. In June 2005 Lions Air planned to lease a McDonnell Douglas MD-80 to start charter flights from Zurich and Geneva to Pristina, Sarajevo and Skopje, but abandoned the plan later in the year.

References

External links

Lions Air

Airlines of Switzerland
Airlines established in 1986
Swiss companies established in 1986